Neapolis meaning "New City", was an ancient city on east coast of the isthmus the Pallene, Chalcidice, ancient Greece between Aphytis and Aege. It was a member of the Delian League.

It is usually identified with the modern town of Polychrono, in Pallini municipality, Chalkidiki prefecture.

See also 
 List of ancient Greek cities

References

Populated places in ancient Macedonia
Former populated places in Greece
Greek colonies in Chalcidice
Members of the Delian League